Azepane is the organic compound with the formula (CH2)6NH.  It is a colorless liquid.  A cyclic secondary amine, it is a precursor to several drugs and pesticides. It is produced by partial hydrogenolysis of hexamethylene diamine.

Like many amines, it reacts with carbon dioxide.

See also 
 Azepine

References